Sporting de Gijón is a football club from Gijón, Spain. They have finished runner-up in La Liga one occasion, and were beaten finalists in the Copa del Rey on two occasions. Real Sporting also won the Segunda División five times.

Honours

National titles
La Liga
Runners-up: 1978–79
Copa del Rey:
Runners-up: 1981, 1982
Segunda División: (5) 1943–44, 1950–51, 1956–57, 1969–70, 1976–77
Runners-up: 1929–30, 2014–15

Regional titles
Asturian Championship: 1916–17, 1917–18, 1918–19, 1919–20, 1920–21, 1921–22, 1922–23, 1923–24, 1925–26, 1926–27, 1929–30, 1930–31, 1939–40

Friendly tournaments 
Ramón de Carranza Trophy: 1984
Trofeo Villa de Gijón: 1996, 2001, 2002, 2008, 2014, 2015, 2016
Trofeo Costa Verde: 1962, 1963, 1965, 1970, 1972, 1975–1979, 1984–1986, 1988–1992
Trofeo Principado: 1988, 1991, 1993, 1994, 2006
Trofeo Ciudad de Pamplona: 1979
Torneo Ciudad de León: 1997
Trofeo Presidente - Ciudad de Oviedo: 1980, 1986
Trofeo Ciudad del Cid: 1981
Trofeo Ibérico: 1972, 1979
Trofeo Conde de Fontao: 1969-1971, 1974, 1977, 1989
Trofeo Emma Cuervo: 1957, 1960, 1963, 1967, 1972, 2007, 2012
Trofeo Ramón Losada: 1997, 1998, 1999, 2001, 2004, 2008, 2009, 2010
Trofeo Concepción Arenal: 1970, 1971
Trofeo Luis Otero: 2003, 2008

Youth football
Copa de Campeones: 2004
Runners-up: 2005, 2018
División de Honor Juvenil de Fútbol (group): (4) 2003–04, 2004–05, 2011–12, 2017–18
Copa del Rey Juvenil de Fútbol:
Runners-up: 2005
Under-16 Spanish Championship:  2000
Under-10 Spanish Championship: 2010, 2012, 2018, 2019

Individual honours
Pichichi Trophy
In Spanish football, the Pichichi Trophy is awarded by Spanish sports newspaper 'Marca' to the top goalscorer for each league season.

Primera División

Segunda División

Zamora Trophy
In Spanish football, the Zamora Trophy is awarded by Spanish sports newspaper Marca to the goalkeeper who has the lowest "goals-to-games" ratio for each league season.

Primera División

Segunda División

Segunda División Player of the Month

Segunda División Manager of the Month

 Players 

 Appearances 
 Youngest La Liga players1: 
 Emilio Blanco:  (1–1 v Athletic Bilbao, La Liga, 31 October 1982)
 Juan Muñiz:  (0–2 loss v Racing Santander, La Liga, 16 May 2010)
 Sergio Álvarez:  (0–2 loss v Racing Santander, La Liga, 16 May 2010)

(1) Not considering players from youth ranks called up during the footballers' strikes of 1981 and 1984.

Most appearances in La Liga

Source

Top goalscorers in La Liga
As of August 2010

Source

 Player of the season 

The following players have been awarded 'El Molinón de Plata' since its creation in 1967, given to the best player of the season by the Federation of Sporting Gijón Supporters Clubs:

Đurđević
(*) Following the disastrous 1997–98 campaign, the prize was not given to any player.

Team statistics

In La LigaSeasons: 42Position in All-time La Liga table: 15th

RecordsHighest final position: 2nd (1978–79)Lowest final position: 20th (1997–98)Most points in a season: 50 (1996–97)Fewest points in a season: 13 (1997–98)Most consecutive seasons in La Liga: 21 (from 1977–78 to 1997–98)Few consecutive seasons in La Liga: 2 (from 1957–58 to 1958–59 and from 2015–16 to 2016–17)Record home win: 7–1 vs Osasuna (1993–94, round 19, 16 January 1994)Record away win: 0–4 at Barcelona (1986–87, round 29, 28 February 1987) and at Mallorca (2010–11, round 21, 29 January 2011)Record home loss: 2–7 vs Atlético Madrid (1947–48, round 26, 11 April 1948) and 1–6 vs Barcelona (2008–09, round 3, 21 September 2008)Record away loss: 9–0 at Barcelona (1951–52, round 22, 10 February 1952) and at Athletic Bilbao (1958–59, round 15, 28 December 1958)

GamesFirst game: 0–0 v Español (1944–45, round 1, 24 September 1944)500th game: 0–0 at Las Palmas (1978–79, round 12, 2 February 1978)1,000th game: 2–1 at Real Burgos (1992–93, round 6, 7 October 1992)Last game: 2–2 v Real Betis (2016–17, round 38, 20 May 2017)

StreaksWinning: 7 (1979–80, round 1 to 7)Winning at home: 12 (1977–78, round 29 to 1978–79, round 17)Winning away: 3 (three times)Unbeaten: 14 (1981–82, round 34 to 1982–83, round 13)Unbeaten at home: 27 (1977–78, round 8 to 1978–79, round 25)Unbeaten away: 9 (1984–85, round 11 to 29)Scoring: 18 (1946–47, round 8 to 25)Scoring at home: 26 (1946–47, round 2 to 1947–48, round 26)Scoring away: 13 (1991–92, round 32 to 1992–93, round 17)Without goals against: 7 (1991–92, round 6 to 12)Without goals against at home: 9 (1984–85, round 22 to 1985–86, round 6)Without goals against away: 4 (two times)Draws streak: 6 (1982–83, round 5 to 10)Draws streak at home: 4 (1991–92, round 37 to 1992–93, round 5)Draws streak away: 4 (1982–83, round 6 to 12)Games without winning: 24 (1996–97, round 42 to 1997–98, round 23)Games without winning at home: 11 (1997–98, round 2 to 22)Games without winning away: 34 (1974–75, round 4 to 1977–78, round 1)Losing: 10 (1953–54, round 13 to 22)Losing at home: 7 (1997–98, round 2 to 14)Losing away: 12 (1953–54, round 8 to 29)Without scoring: 5 (three times)Without scoring at home: 4 (1989–90, round 28 to 34)Without scoring away: 8 (1995–96, round 7 to 21)With goals against: 29 (1997–98, round 1 to 29)With goals against at home: 18 (1947–48, round 9 to 1951–52, round 16)With goals against away: 27 (1947–48, round 22 to 1952–53, round 20)

In Segunda DivisiónSeasons: 46

RecordsHighest final position: 1st (1941–42, 1942–43, 1943–44, 1950–51, 1956–57, 1969–70, 1976–77)Lowest final position: 13th (1960–61, 1961–62, 2006–07)Most consecutive seasons in Segunda División: 13 (from 1929 to 1943–44)Few consecutive seasons in Segunda División: 1 (1976–77)Record win: 11–0 vs Lleida (1956–57)Record away win: 2–7 at Ilicitano (1969–70)Record home loss: 0–6 vs Oviedo (1955–56)Record away loss: 6–0 at Alavés (1929), at Osasuna (1933–34) and at Racing Santander (1962–63)

In Copa del ReyParticipations: 87 (first in 1917)Best performance: Runner-up (1980–81 and 1981–82)Times semifinalist: 9Last one: 1994–95 v DeportivoTimes quarterfinalist: 16 (5 as Segunda División team)Last one: 2008–09 v AthleticFirst game: 0–1 v Arenas Getxo (1917, first leg of the quarterfinals, 11 March 1917)

In UEFA CupParticipations: 6Best performance: Round of 32 (1978–79 and 1991–92)Top goalscorers:
Enzo Ferrero (3)
Milan Luhový and Enrique Morán (2)

RecordsRecord home win: 3–0 v Torino (1978–79, first leg of the Round of 64, 13 September 1978)Record home loss: 1–2 v Köln (1985–86, second leg of the Round of 64) and 0–1 v Crvena Zvezda (1978–79, first leg of the Round of 32)Record away loss: 3–0 at Milan (1987–88, second leg of the Round of 64, 30 September 1987)

GoalsFirst goal''': Ferrero (3–0 v Torino, UEFA Cup, first leg of the Round of 64, 13 September 1978)

Penalty shootouts

By competition

Complete list

 Key
  = scored penalty
  = scored penalty which ended the shoot-out
  = missed penalty
  = missed penalty which ended the shoot-out
  = the first penalty in the shoot-out
 horizontal line within a list of takers = beginning of the sudden death stage

References

Records And Statistics
Sporting Gijon
Records